Aslauga bella, the large blue aslauga, is a butterfly in the family Lycaenidae. It is found in Nigeria and Cameroon.

References

External links
Images representing Aslauga bella at Barcodes of Life

Butterflies described in 1913
Aslauga